Suzanne Dekker (born 31 October 1949) is a former Dutch politician of Democrats 66 (D66). Born in Amsterdam, she sat as a member of the European Parliament (MEP) from the Netherlands between 1979 and 1981. Dekker also served in the Dutch House of Representatives from 1981 to 1982.

References

1949 births
Living people
20th-century Dutch women politicians
20th-century Dutch politicians
Democrats 66 MEPs
Members of the House of Representatives (Netherlands)
MEPs for the Netherlands 1979–1984
Politicians from Amsterdam